Strategic and Critical Materials Stock Piling Act of 1939, 50 USC § 98, is a United States federal law establishing strategic materials supply reserves for the United States common defense, industrial demands, and military commitments. The Act of Congress authorize the acquisition of raw material stocks for inventory disposition, rotation, and storage within the United States.

The Senate legislation was passed by the 76th Congressional session and enacted into law by the 32nd President of the United States Franklin Roosevelt on June 7, 1939.

Provisions of the Act
The strategic war materials federal law was drafted as seven sections providing critical material supplies in the event of dependence for a national emergency or threat to the national security of the United States.

Amendments to 1939 Act
Amendments and authorization extensions to the Strategic and Critical Materials Stock Piling Act.

See also
Byrd Amendment (1971)
Defense Logistics Agency
Defense National Stockpile Center
Foreign Economic Administration
National Strategic and Critical Minerals Production Act of 2013
Strategic National Stockpile
War reserve stock

External links
 
 
 
 
 
 
 
 
 
 

1939 in American law
76th United States Congress